Judge William Osceola Gordon (1837–1914) was an American judge.

Early life
William Osceola Gordon was born on October 23, 1837, in Maury County, Tennessee. He was a direct descendant of Pocahontas. His father, Powhatan Gordon, was a farmer and politician. His middle name, 'Osceola', comes from Osceola, a Native American chief that his father fought against in the Second Seminole War.

Gordon graduated from Jackson College. He was admitted to the bar in 1885.

Career
Gordon was a jurist. He served on the county court from 1902 to 1904.

Gordon was a member of the Democratic Party. He campaigned for Thomas Clarke Rye to become Governor of Tennessee.

Personal life and death
Gordon married Virginia C. Graham on May 3, 1859. They had a son, Powhatan Graham Gordon, and a daughter, Louisa, who married Willis E. Jones. He was a Freemason, and a member of Royal Arcanum.

Gordon died on December 31, 1914, in Columbia, Tennessee. His funeral was held at St. John's Episcopal Church.

References

External links

1837 births
1914 deaths
American people of Scottish descent
People from Maury County, Tennessee
County judges in the United States
Tennessee Democrats
19th-century American judges